Peponidium is a genus of flowering plants in the family Rubiaceae. The genus is endemic to Madagascar, except for Peponidium ovato-oblongum and Peponidium venulosum that are found on the Comoros, and Peponidium carinatum and Peponidium celastroides that are found on the Seychelles.

Species

 Peponidium alleizettei (Dubard & Dop) Razafim., Lantz & B.Bremer
 Peponidium ankaranense (Arènes ex Cavaco) Razafim., Lantz & B.Bremer
 Peponidium anoveanum (Cavaco) Razafim., Lantz & B.Bremer
 Peponidium arenesianum (Cavaco) Razafim., Lantz & B.Bremer
 Peponidium bakerianum (Drake) Kainulainen & Razafim.
 Peponidium blepharodon (Arènes ex Cavaco) Razafim., Lantz & B.Bremer
 Peponidium boinense (Arènes ex Cavaco) Razafim., Lantz & B.Bremer
 Peponidium boivinianum (Baker) A.P.Davis & Razafim.
 Peponidium bosseri (Cavaco) Razafim., Lantz & B.Bremer
 Peponidium buxifolium (Baker) Razafim., Lantz & B.Bremer
 Peponidium calcaratum Homolle ex Arènes
 Peponidium capuronii Cavaco
 Peponidium carinatum (Baker) Kainulainen & Razafim.
 Peponidium celastroides (Baker) Kainulainen & Razafim.
 Peponidium crassifolium Lantz, Klack. & Razafim.
 Peponidium cuspidatum Arènes
 Peponidium cystiporon (Cavaco) Razafim., Lantz & B.Bremer
 Peponidium decaryi (Homolle ex Cavaco) Razafim., Lantz & B.Bremer
 Peponidium densiflorum (Baker) A.P.Davis & Razafim.
 Peponidium flavum Homolle ex Arènes
 Peponidium homolleae Arènes
 Peponidium homolleanum (Cavaco) Kainulainen & Razafim.
 Peponidium horridum Arènes
 Peponidium humbertianum (Cavaco) Razafim., Lantz & B.Bremer
 Peponidium humbertii Homolle ex Arènes
 Peponidium ihosyense Arènes
 Peponidium lanceolatifolium Cavaco
 Peponidium latiflorum (Homolle ex Cavaco) Razafim., Lantz & B.Bremer
 Peponidium madagascariense Cavaco
 Peponidium marojejyense (Cavaco) Razafim., Lantz & B.Bremer
 Peponidium micranthum (Baker) A.P.Davis & Razafim.
 Peponidium occidentale Homolle ex Arènes
 Peponidium orientale (Arènes) Cavaco
 Peponidium ovato-oblongum (K.Schum.) Mouly
 Peponidium pallens (Baill.) Arènes
 Peponidium pallidum Arènes
 Peponidium parvifolium Arènes
 Peponidium perrieri Arènes
 Peponidium pervilleanoides Arènes
 Peponidium pervilleanum (Baill.) Homolle ex Arènes
 Peponidium sahafaryense (Cavaco) Razafim., Lantz & B.Bremer
 Peponidium sakalavense Razafim., Lantz & B.Bremer
 Peponidium subevenium (K.Schum.) Razafim., Lantz & B.Bremer
 Peponidium tamatavense (Cavaco) Razafim., Lantz & B.Bremer
 Peponidium tsaratananense Arènes
 Peponidium velutinum Arènes
 Peponidium venulosum (Boivin ex Baill.) Razafim., Lantz & B.Bremer
 Peponidium viguieri (Homolle ex Cavaco) Razafim., Lantz & B.Bremer

External links
World Checklist of Rubiaceae

Rubiaceae genera
Vanguerieae
Taxa named by Henri Ernest Baillon